Ravy is a male given name. Notable people with this name include:

 Ol Ravy (born 1993), Cambodian football player
 Ravy Truchot (born 1972), French entrepreneur
 Ravy Tsouka (born 1994), Congolese football player

See also
 Ravi (name)

Masculine given names